Japu Willk'i (Aymara japu ember; floury, willk'i gap, "ember gap" or "floury gap", also spelled Japu Willkhi) is a mountain in the Andes of Bolivia which reaches a height of approximately . It is located in the Oruro Department, San Pedro de Totora Province. Japu Willk'i lies at the Sulluma River, southeast of Ch'alla Willk'i.

References 

Mountains of Oruro Department